Mohd Marzuki Yusof (born 3 January 1981) is a Malaysian former footballer  who last playing for T-Team, a team playing in the Malaysian Super League. He was a former member of Malaysia national U-23 team.

He played almost of his career with Terengganu, also playing with Melaka Telekom for two seasons. He is the current captain of the T-Team. He also the member of Malaysia national senior team from 2002 until 2003. After five years of absence from national team, Marzuki earned a call-up for 2011 AFC Asian Cup qualification.

References

External links
 Md Marzuki Yusof info at ganusoccer.net

Living people
Malaysian footballers
Malaysia international footballers
Terengganu FC players
1981 births
Association football defenders